Vladimir Tolmachyov may refer to:

 Vladimir Tolmachyov (footballer) (born 1996), Russian football player
 Vladimir Tolmachyov (politician) (1887–1937), Soviet politician and statesman